The 1969 British League season was the 35th season of the top tier of speedway in the United Kingdom and the fifth season known as the British League.

Summary
The 19 competitors were the same as the previous season. 

Poole Pirates won their first title. The Pirates were extremely consistent and despite their riders not coming in the top 18 league averages they won the league by a clear 6 points. Pete Smith was their top rider with an average of 9.34 but aided by four other riders (Geoff Mudge (9.05), Odd Fossengen (7.73), Bruce Cribb (7.31) and Gordon Guasco (7.26)) they were able to claim the title. Wimbledon Dons had a much better season than the last, finishing third and managed to retain their British League Knockout Cup crown. Belle Vue Aces finished runner-up, mainly due to the performances of their outstanding World champion rider Ivan Mauger; the New Zealander finished with an average of 11.67 and would also seal his second world title before the end of the season.

Final table
M = Matches; W = Wins; D = Draws; L = Losses; Pts = Total Points

British League Knockout Cup
The 1969 British League Knockout Cup was the 31st edition of the Knockout Cup for tier one teams. Wimbledon were the winners.

First round

Second round

Quarter-finals

Semi-finals

Final

First leg

Second leg

Wimbledon Dons were declared Knockout Cup Champions, winning on aggregate 94-62.

Final leading averages

Riders & final averages
Belle Vue

 11.67
 10.09
 8.58
 6.41
 5.92
 4.60
 4.33
 4.30
 4.14
 3.84
 3.56
 3.24

Coatbridge

 10.01 
 7.94
 7.14
 6.39
 5.93
 5.17
 4.24
 3.82

Coventry

 10.78
 7.55
 7.36
 6.81
 6.67
 5.54
 5.41
y 4.83
 4.74
 3.28

Cradley Heath

 9.27
 9.11
 7.93
 5.29
 4.90
 4.31
 4.15
 1.29

Exeter

 9.97
 8.12
 7.31
 5.22
 5.15
 4.95
 4.75
 4.55
 4.27

Glasgow

 10.01
 9.56 
 8.09 
 5.61 
 5.01
 4.25
 3.41
 2.91

Hackney

 7.35
 7.05
 6.33
 6.17
 5.45
 5.10
 5.03
 4.88
 4.50
 3.10

Halifax

 11.08
 9.38
 7.67
 7.16
 6.23
 5.33
 4.00
 3.76

King's Lynn

 9.35 
 8.14
 (Kid Bodie) 7.72
 6.44
 4.95
 4.89
 4.19

Leicester

 10.56
 8.76
 6.47
 6.44
 6.21 
 5.16
 4.88

Newcastle

 10.39
 7.34 
 4.80
 4.63
 4.00
 3.47
 3.23

Newport

 8.34 
 6.29
 6.06
 5.95
 5.92 
 5.83
 4.67
 3.74
 2.73

Oxford

 8.08
 8.03
 7.24
 7.00
 6.65
 5.27
 4.17
 4.00
 4.00
 3.61

Poole

 9.34 
 9.05
 7.73
 7.31
 7.26
 5.55
 4.50

Sheffield

 9.90 
 8.62
 8.43 
 6.00 
 5.85
 5.59
 5.42
 3.80

Swindon

 11.12
 7.78
 6.71
 6.13
 5.43
 4.87
 4.76
 2.04

West Ham

 9.78
 8.49
 7.91
 7.69
 5.30
 5.03
 4.07
 3.63
 3.62
 2.20
 1.87

Wimbledon

 10.33
 9.74
 9.39
 6.56
 6.34
 6.10
 5.57
 3.30

Wolverhampton

 10.35
 7.38
 7.27
 6.11
 5.98
 5.70
 5.22
 3.76
 3.26

See also
List of United Kingdom Speedway League Champions
Knockout Cup (speedway)

References

British League
1969 in British motorsport
1969 in speedway